Joshua Saul Martin (born 9 September 2001) is an English professional footballer who plays as a winger for EFL League One club Barnsley on loan from  club Norwich City.

Club career

Norwich City
Martin joined the academy of Arsenal at the age of 8, and progressed through the various age groups before joining Norwich City in March 2019 at the age of 17 following a successful trial period with the club's under-18 side.

Martin made his professional debut as a late substitute in a Premier League game against Southampton on 19 June 2020. He scored his first goal for Norwich in a 2-1 win against Sheffield Wednesday on 5 December 2020.

On 1 July 2021, Martin joined League One club Milton Keynes Dons on a season-long loan. Following limited opportunities with MK Dons, Martin was recalled on 17 January 2022 and sent back out on loan to another League One club, Doncaster Rovers, for the remainder of the season.

On 31 August 2022, Martin returned to League One when he joined Barnsley on a season-long loan deal, the club holding the option to make the move permanent.

Personal life
Martin was born in Luton, England on 9 September 2001 and is of English, Irish, and Caribbean heritage.

Career statistics

Honours

Norwich City
EFL Championship: 2020–21

References

2001 births
Living people
English footballers
English people of Portuguese descent
English people of Irish descent
Association football forwards
Arsenal F.C. players
Norwich City F.C. players
Milton Keynes Dons F.C. players
Doncaster Rovers F.C. players
Barnsley F.C. players
Premier League players
English Football League players